Bellevue is a railway station in the French commune of Meudon in the Île-de-France administrative region. It is on the Paris–Brest railway. It is served by Transilien trains from Paris-Montparnasse to Rambouillet, Dreux and Mantes-la-Jolie.

History 

From 1893 to 1934, the station served as an interchange with the upper station of the Bellevue funicular.

Station 
The station is served by trains on the Transilien Paris – Montparnasse Line N, on the Transilien network.

The station had two staggered side platforms and a central island platform, serving four tracks. Access between platforms was via an underpass. The two side platforms were used in case of difficulty or track maintenance.

The current structures date from the 1930s, when the Montparnasse to Versailles line was quadrupled by Raoul Dautry.

Interchanges 
 Bus: 169, 389, TIM
 Night bus: N61

In modern times

External links
 

Railway stations in Hauts-de-Seine
Railway stations in France opened in 1840